Roizl bas Yosef Fishels of Krakow was a Polish Jewish printer and teacher.

Her paternal grandfather Rabbi Yehuda ha-Levi ran a yeshiva for fifty years in Ludomir. In 1586, she printed a translation of Tehillim into Yiddish by Moshe Stendel, prefaced by an autobiographical poem of her own.

References

Year of death unknown
Year of birth unknown
16th-century Jews
16th-century Polish women writers
16th-century publishers (people)
Yiddish-language poets
Polish Ashkenazi Jews